Shriner Peak is a 5,834-foot-elevation (1,778 m) mountain summit located in Mount Rainier National Park in Pierce County of Washington state. It is part of the Cascade Range and is situated south of Cayuse Pass, southwest of Seymour Peak, and southeast of Double Peak. A four mile trail leads from Highway 123 to the Shriner Peak Fire Lookout at the top of the mountain. Precipitation runoff from Shriner Peak drains into tributaries of the Cowlitz River.

Climate
Shriner Peak is located in the marine west coast climate zone of western North America. Most weather fronts originate in the Pacific Ocean, and travel northeast toward the Cascade Mountains. As fronts approach, they are forced upward by the peaks of the Cascade Range (Orographic lift), causing them to drop their moisture in the form of rain or snowfall onto the Cascades. As a result, the west side of the Cascades experiences high precipitation, especially during the winter months in the form of snowfall. During winter months, weather is usually cloudy, but, due to high pressure systems over the Pacific Ocean that intensify during summer months, there is often little or no cloud cover during the summer. Because of maritime influence, snow tends to be wet and heavy, resulting in high avalanche danger.

References

External links
 National Park Service web site: Mount Rainier National Park
 Weather: Shriner Peak

Cascade Range
Mountains of Pierce County, Washington
Mountains of Washington (state)
Mount Rainier National Park
North American 1000 m summits